Parkview School can refer to:

Parkview Community College of Technology — Barrow-in-Furness, Cumbria, England
Parkview High School (Georgia) — Lilburn, Georgia
Parkview High School (Missouri) — Springfield, Missouri
Parkview High School (Wisconsin) — Orfordville, Wisconsin
Parkview Arts and Science Magnet High School — Little Rock, Arkansas
Oklahoma School for the Blind, also known as Parkview School
Parkview School (Edmonton) — Edmonton, Alberta, Canada
Parkview School (Christchurch) — Parklands, Christchurch, New Zealand